Nekala is a neighbourhood in the district of Iides in the city of Tampere, Finland. The area has one of Finland's biggest allotment gardens.

References

External links
Nekala website
Detective Agency Nekala(in Finnish)

Districts of Tampere